Carlos Choque (born 22 August 1912, date of death unknown) was an Argentine sports shooter. He competed in the 50 m pistol event at the 1952 Summer Olympics.

References

1912 births
Year of death missing
Argentine male sport shooters
Olympic shooters of Argentina
Shooters at the 1952 Summer Olympics
Place of birth missing